Charlie Healy may refer to:

Charlie Healy (footballer) (1899–1985), Australian rules footballer for North Melbourne
Charlie Healy (singer), English singer in the band The Risk from the X Factor television show

See also
Charles Healy (1883–?), American water polo player